Kelvin Lewis Taylor (born January 18, 1985, in Hampton, Virginia), is an American born New Zealand actor based in Auckland.  His film appearances include the documentary "The Golden Hour". The documentary received an International Emmy nomination for the Best Documentary Award at the 41st International Emmy Awards. Taylor appeared on the second week of the first season of Come Dine with Me New Zealand.

Early life
Taylor was raised in Newport News, Virginia alongside his twin sister, Princess. His ethnic heritage links him to Nigerian Moors; he is of African, British, German, Irish, and French descent. His mother, Rhonda (Taylor) Clark, was a playwright who was orphaned in New Orleans and relocated to New York City. Taylor made his stage debut in 1990 at the age of 5, playing the lead role in a kindergarten production of The Gingerbread Man. When he was 11, his family relocated to Virginia Beach, Virginia.

Career

Taylor began modelling at age 19 for the Shmack Clothing in collaboration with Billionaire Boys Club / BAPE. An altercation would later hinder his modelling career and lead him into undergoing emergency plastic surgery. It was later revealed according to a 2020 article in The New Zealand Herald the attack was racially motivated. After making friendships on social-media website MySpace, a trip to Sydney, Australia and Perth, Western Australia in 2008 lead him into acting after signing up to a roommates short film as a breakdancer for Edith Cowan University. He later would appeared in commercials and music videos for the likes of N.E.R.D, Fam-Lay feat. Pharrell Williams. Humble beginnings, he would find a start as a background actor in Spartacus before showing up on New Zealand's Three (TV channel).

Taylor went on to make guest appearances in Ash vs Evil Dead, The Shannara Chronicles and James Patterson's Murder Is Forever. He was cast as Malcolm X in American Playboy: The Hugh Hefner Story, however the role was cancelled as production opted to use archived footage instead. He was also a student of Meisner Technique instructor Michael Saccenté, acting coach of Karl Urban and Antony Starr (The Boys).

As of 2008, Kelvin Taylor resides between Australia, New Zealand and the United States. Having appearing on Adult Swim's FishCenter Live and Post Malone's Goodbyes (Post Malone song) Music Video, he was recently cast in Season 2 of Gēmusetto: Death Beat(s)

Filmography

Films

Television

Documentary

Music video

References

External links 

 

1985 births
Living people
21st-century Australian male actors
Australian people of African-American descent
Male actors from Virginia
21st-century New Zealand male actors
People from Hampton, Virginia
People from Virginia Beach, Virginia